The Campbell Baking Company is a historic building located in Waterloo, Iowa, United States.  Built in 1927, the single-story, yellow brick structure is basically a utilitarian building with Spanish Revival decorative elements on its primary and secondary façades.  An addition from the early 1930s complements the original building, while additions from 1957 and 1977 do not.  The last addition incorporated an unrelated brick building into the bakery complex. The original building was designed by the Toledo, Ohio architectural firm of Mills, Rhines, Bellman & Nordhoff, and built by the John G. Miller Construction Company.  The building represents the consolidation of the bakery industry in the early 20th century from neighborhood retail bakers to local wholesalers to national industrial wholesale bakery companies.   The Campbell Baking Company entered the Waterloo market as a financial backer of the Peerless Baking Company, which was formed in 1917.  Campbell took over Peerless in 1921 in an older bakery building.  It had become outmoded and too small for their needs, so they had this building constructed.  They produce Wonder Bread and Hostess Twinkies here.  The building was listed on the National Register of Historic Places in 2016.

References

Industrial buildings completed in 1927
Buildings and structures in Waterloo, Iowa
National Register of Historic Places in Black Hawk County, Iowa
Industrial buildings and structures on the National Register of Historic Places in Iowa
Spanish Colonial Revival architecture in Iowa
Bakeries of the United States